Fergus Scott (born 1 August 1992 in Scotland) is a Scotland Club XV international rugby union player who plays for Currie Chieftains at the Hooker position.

Scott has represented Scotland at under-17, under-18 and under-20 level. He has captained the Scotland under-20 side  and has been called up to the Scotland Club XV side.

He has played for Currie RFC and Ayr RFC and is also a coach at Glasgow University Rugby Football Club.

Scott signed for the Glasgow Warriors in 2012 as part of their Elite Development Programme. The hooker is the younger brother of Edinburgh Rugby centre Matt Scott.

Fergus was voted first XV Young Player of the Year at the end of season awards for 2013–14 for Ayr RFC.

On 11 March 2015 it was announced that Scott signed a full professional contract to Glasgow Warriors till May 2016.

He was released in 2016 and now plays for Currie.

External links 
 Glasgow Warriors: Academy quartet sign professional deals

References 

1992 births
Living people
Scottish rugby union players
Glasgow Warriors players
Ayr RFC players
Currie RFC players
Scotland Club XV international rugby union players
Rugby union hookers